Meysami Expressway is an expressway in southwestern Esfahan in Iran. It connects southern and western expressways together.

Streets in Isfahan